Suán is a municipality and town in the Colombian department of Atlántico.

References

External links 
 Gobernacion del Atlantico - Suan
 Suan official website

Municipalities of Atlántico Department